The MV Agusta F4 is an inline four-cylinder sport bike made by MV Agusta from 1999 until 2018. It was the motorcycle that launched the resurrection of the brand in 1998. The F4 was created by motorcycle designer Massimo Tamburini at CRC (Cagiva Research Center), following his work on the Ducati 916. The F4 has a single-sided swingarm, large diameter front forks  and traditional MV Agusta red and silver livery. The F4 engine is also one of the few production superbikes to have a hemi-spherical cylinder head chamber design with 4 valves per cylinder.

Engine 
The engine was derived from the 1990–1992 Ferrari Formula One engine. Early in the design process Ferrari engineers assisted in the development of the engine. MV (Cagiva at the time) quickly deviated from the Ferrari design, but they kept one important feature, the radial valves. The F4 engine is unique in the sense that it is the only recently produced radial-valved motorcycle engine.

Torque Shift System 
The F4 Tamburini, F4 Veltro, and F4 CC models are equipped with variable length intake ducts known as the "TSS" system. The "TSS" system is designed to increase torque in the low to midrange, while still allowing for maximum horsepower at the top of the rev range (usually two mutually exclusive properties of an engine). The "TSS" system has two positions, it is not able to vary the height of the intake ducts continuously. "TSS" is able to lower peak torque from the 10000 rpm to 9000 rpm while maintaining maximum power. This system debuted on the F4 Tamburini and was lauded by independent motorcycling publications such as Australian Motorcycle News.

F4 750 
The 750 cc F4 went into production 1999 and continued, through various models, until 2004 when it was discontinued in favour of the newly introduced 1,000 cc models.

F4 750 Serie Oro 

The first model of the rebirth of MV Agusta was the F4 750 Serie Oro, first revealed at the 1997 Milan EICMA Motorcycle show. The first production models were released to the public in May 1999. Production was limited to 300 examples, all of which were pre-sold. Many parts such as the swinging arm, frame side plates and wheels were made from magnesium. These magnesium parts were anodized gold for consistency with the name 'Oro' (Italian for gold). All painted parts, such as fairings, seat cover, front mudguard, fuel tank and air box are made of carbon fibre. Using these materials the weight was kept under  (later beaten by the F4 Veltro). The Showa fork specially made for MV Agusta has fast-detach axle clamps. The six piston (front) and 4 piston (rear) brake calipers are made by Nissin. The exclusive model came with a Certificate of Authenticity and a 24-carat gold badge with the serial number on. Amongst the original owners were MV World Champion Giacomo Agostini and King Juan Carlos of Spain.

F4 750 S 

The mass production model, the F4 750 S (for Strada), released in October 1999. It was essentially the same bike as the F4 750 Oro but with aluminium components in place of magnesium and ABS parts instead of carbon fibre. These changes add approximately 20 pounds to the weight of the bike. The bike has a trellis frame made of steel tubing and aluminium castings. Front forks are upside-down 49 mm from Showa, and a fully adjustable Sachs shock absorber controls the single-sided swinging arm.

Sharing the same engine as the Oro, the engine produced  at 12,500 rpm.

The F4 750 was a single-seater (monoposto) and in 2000, the F4 750 S 1+1 (Biposto) model was introduced, which has provisions for a pillion passenger.

F4 750 S Neiman Marcus Edition 
The F4 750 S Neiman Marcus Edition produced for American luxury department stores chain Neiman Marcus. It was only available only from the Neiman Marcus 2000 Christmas catalog silver book ("gifts for guys"). Virtually identical to the F4 750 S except for a special brass plate with the Neiman Marcus logo stamped on the triple clamp. There were only 10 available through the Christmas Book and with each purchase, Neiman Marcus included VIP tickets to the International Superbike Classic at Laguna Seca Raceway followed by one day of California Superbike School conducted by Keith Code.

F4 750 S Evo 02
In 2002, the F4 750 S Evo 02 model was released. This model had an upgraded engine (originally intended for a SPR version that was cancelled) with reworked combustion chamber, valves and springs. New Mahle forged pistons were used in an updated block.

F4 750 Senna 

The F4 750 Senna was also released in 2002. MV CEO, Claudio Castiglioni, was a close personal friend of Ayrton Senna and introduced this special to help the Instituto Ayrton Senna, a charity founded by Senna to aid the children and young people of Brazil. Production was limited to 300 machines.

The Senna used the 136 bhp from the Evo 02 model. The cylinder heads were carefully selected to provide closer tolerances, and combined with a modified eprom, allowed the red-line to be raised to 13,900 rpm. Much of the bodywork replaced with carbon fibre items, the suspension was upgraded and distinctive wheels were fitted. The bike was finished in black with red highlighting and had a silver numbered plaque.

F4 750 S Evo 03

In 2003, the F4 750 S Evo 03 was released, which was mostly a cosmetic upgrade.

F4 750 SPR 

The F4 750 SPR was released in 2003 and was intended to be the final evolution on the F4 750 platform, mainly aimed at track use. The engine was uprated from the 750 Senna with higher compression pistons, redesigned inlet and exhaust post, refrofiled combustion chamber and hand polished inlet port. Additionally, the camshaft, tappets and valve springs were also changed. These modifications allowed the SPR to produce  at 13,000 rpm ( with the optional race exhaust and chip). The clutch was uprated and a close ratio gearbox fitted.

The bike had uprated suspension, 50mm Marzocchi Titanium nitride coated forks were used at the front and a race quality Sachs shock absorber on the rear. Much of the bodywork was in carbon fibre. The bike was finished in black with polished aluminium wheels. This was a limited-edition model with only 300 units made.

F4 750 SR
A limited-edition F4 AGO had been planned based on the SPR, but a change in plan saw the AGO use the new 1,000 cc engine. To use the 750 SPR engines that were intended to go into the AGO, the SPR engines were put into 750S chassis and the model designated the F4 750 SR. Gold exhausts similar to the Serie Oro were added, and white faced instruments which displays Agostini's signature in red, as later used on the AGO model, were added. The machine was painted in the traditional MV livery of red and silver. This 2004 limited-edition model was the last F4 750 to go into production, which was limited to 300 units.

F4 SP-01 Viper
The F4 SP-01 Viper was a limited-edition upgrade kit that could be fitted to the F4 750S, produced by MV's Reparto Corse department. The kit could also be fitted to the F4 1000S. The kit consisted of carbon fibre bodywork, a titanium treated windshield, magnesium wheels, embroidered Alcantara seat and side mirrors. The kit was finished in silver and blue and came with an 18 carat gold plaque engraved with the number of the kit and a certificate of authenticity signed by designer Massimo Tamburini. The upgrade was limited to 50 units.

F4 1000 
The F4 engine was originally designed to meet the then limit of 750 cc of the Superbike World Championship, although an experimental 898 cc version was produced in 1998. With the sports bike market moving towards 1,000 cc machines, the motore grosso (big engine) project was revived by MV's head of engine development, Andrea Goggi, in 2001. MV had previously been approached by Steven Casaer of Maxim Experience team, to enter an MV in the FIM Endurance World Championship. An agreement was reached for the team to enter the 2001 & 2002 WEC, using the motore grosso. Various engines of 898, 952 and 998 cc were used. With the experience and development from the partnership with the Maxim Team, MV entered Andrea Mazzali in the Italian Superbike Championship on a 1,000 cc machine, which was code-named the F5, for further development and testing. (Rule changes to the Superbike Championship allowed 4 cylinder machines for 2003)

The 1,000 engine was first used in production machine in 2005 with the introduction of the F4 1000 AGO.

F4 1000 AGO 

Like the F4 750 and the Oro, the new F4 1000 product line began with a special edition F4 1000 called the F4 1000 AGO in 2005. The machine was a tribute to multiple champion, Giacomo Agostini, who had won most of his championships on an MV. It premiered the new 998cc engine, which produced 166 HP (122 kW) at 11,750 rpm and had a red-line at 12,700 rpm. The frame was derived from the 750 cc item, 49 mm titanium nitride coated Showa front fork were used and a Sachs Racing shock absorber controlled the rear. Brakes were the same as used on the Oro, Nissin 6 pot calipers and discs with a gold flange. Wheels were a new design from Marchesini, forged in aluminium alloy.

Finished in classic MV Agusta red and silver, the single-seater bike came with special graphics prominently displaying the number "1" in a yellow oval in reference to MV Agusta's racing heritage and rider Agostini. The seat was finished in red Alcantara, with an F4 logo embroidered on it. The instruments had white faces with blue markings, and the rev-counter featured Agostini's signature. Production was limited to 300 bikes.

F4 1000 S 

The first mass-produced F4 1000, the F4 1000 S, was released in 2005 and came with the same 166 bhp engine of the AGO model. Compared to the previous 750 cc models, the 1000 S was fitted with 50 mm Marzocchi front upside-down fork and Sachs rear shock absorber with hydraulic control of spring pre-load. The screen had been re-profiled and adjustable footrests fitted. The machine was available in red/silver, silver/yellow, Silver/Blue and Matte Black.

The 1000 S was a single-seater, but was available as the F4 1000 S 1+1 version with provision for a pillion a passenger.

F4 Tamburini 

The F4 Tamburini was a special edition of the F4 1000 S released in 2005. It was the first F4 to be equipped with the Torque Shift System (TSS), which varies the length of the intake trumpets with speed in order to provide optimum torque at low and high engine speeds. All the bodywork was carbon fibre except for the fuel tank. Only 300 were produced. The bike is named after its designer Massimo Tamburini.

F4 1000 Mamba 
First shown at the 2003 Milan EICMA Motorcycle show, the F4 1000 Mamba was a collection of three kits to upgrade the F4 1000 S. The livery was red and black (and clear coated carbon fibre on the limited edition kits). The colours were inspired by the black mamba snake. The three versions were:

F4 1000 Nero
At the request of Australian MV Agusta distributor and former motorcycle champion Paul Feeney, the limited edition F4 1000 Nero was produced. The all black bike was limited to 21 examples.

F4 Veltro 

The 2006 F4 Veltro came in two models, the F4 Veltro Strada (road) and F4 Veltro Pista (race). Ninety-nine examples of the Strada were produced, as well as 23 examples of the Pista. The Veltro models engines feature the TSS system from the Tamburini. The machines were built at the Cagiva Research Center in San Marino. These are considered by to be the most race-oriented F4's made.

The Veltro Strada is equipped with a full complement of carbon fibre (fairings, tail, airbox, mud guards, fenders, air ducts, heat shield) and magnesium frame plates.

Being for track use only, the Pista is not equipped with lights.

Veltro is Italian for greyhound, and is also the mascot of Gruppo 23 of the Aeronautica Militare (Italian Air Force), whose logo features on the bike. Finish is matt black and there are graphics in the style of a WWII Italian fighter plane.

F4 CC 

The F4 CC, named after Claudio Castiglioni, the managing director of MV Agusta, was first shown at the Milan EICMA in 2006. 

The F4 CC uses a new 1,078 cc engine that delivers 200 bhp (147 kW) at 12,200 rpm. The engine has a 3 mm larger bore than the 998 cc engines to produce the extra displacement. Inlet valves are of a bigger diameter and the valve train is manufactured by American specialists Del West. The MV Agusta racing department led by Andea Goggi polished and lightened many of the internal components, many being made from exotic metals. The engine is 4 kg lighter than the 1,000 R engine.

The frame is the standard F4 item, but with magnesium frame plates and swinging arm. Front forks are carbon nitride treated 50 mm Marzocchi units with a Sachs racing shock absorber at the rear. Brakes are Brembo racing items and Brembo Super Light “Y” spoked wheels are fitted. Bodywork features extensive use of carbon fibre.

The model had a price tag of $120,000,  and came with a matching, numbered Girard-Perregaux watch and a Trussardi special leather jacket. Only 100 machines were made available.

F4 1000 Senna 

The F4 1000 Senna was a special edition of the F4 1000 R released in 2006. The model used the same 174 bhp as the 1000 R. Visually it was similar to the 2002 F4 750 Senna and again proceeds from its sales went to Senna's foundation Instituto Ayrton Senna. Front forks were black titanium nitride treated 50 mm upside-down Marzocchi items. The gold, 4-pot, radial, Brembo Racing “Serie Oro” front brake calipers were exclusive to this model. Silver Marchesini wheels with Y-shaped spokes were fitted.

The livery was black/grey over a metallic silver base, with red highlighting, including the Senna logo. A red Alcantara seat was fitted, embroidered with the F4 logo.

F4 1000 R 

The second mass-produced F4 1000, the F4 1000 R was released in 2007 and came with an updated 174 bhp (128 kW) engine. The engine had been extensively re-worked compared to previous models. A new frame was used on the 1000 R, which was an evolution of the frame used on previous models. The bike also has upgraded Brembo Monobloc radial brakes, forged black Brembo wheels, carbon-nitride coated Marzocchi upside down fork and an upgraded Sachs rear shock absorber (compression & rebound damping adjustable in high & low speed range). The 1000 R engine does not utilize the TSS system. The bike was available in black "Bodoni" livery, or an upgrade of the traditional red/silver “Corse” racing livery. The machine was intended to lie between the 1000 S and the limited edition F4 Senna.

An F4 1000 R 1+1 (Biposto) version was available that added provision for a pillion passenger.

F4 Corse 
A limited edition kit was available for the F4 1000 R, the F4 Corse, that added carbon fibre bodywork, a new exhaust and silver wheels. 300 kits were available for the 1000 R, and a similar number for the 1+1. The kits came with a certificate of authenticity and a numbered silver plaque for the top yoke.

F4 R 312 

The F4 R 312 was released in late 2007 as a 2008 model. It is an evolution of the F4 1000 R model, which it replaced. The engine had been uprated to comply with the Euro 3 emissions standard. This is due to 30 mm titanium intake valves, modified camshafts and 48 mm throttle bodies.

The chassis, suspension, brakes and wheels were from the 1000 R. The bike was offered in a gloss black/grey, pearl white/black or "Corsa" red/silver finish.

A two-seater version, the F4 R 312 1+1 was also available.

F4 RR 312 

For 2009, MV Agusta replaced the F4 R 312 with the 1,078 cc F4 RR 312. A 1,078 engine had previously been used in the F4 CC. The engine in the RR produced  at 12,200 rpm. The engine had a wide spread of power, maximum torque being produced at 8,200 rpm. A new slipper clutch was fitted, and also a new instrument panel. Chassis parts were carried over from the R 312 model and the bike was available in racing red/Silver, pearl white/gloss black or black/anthracite grey finishes.

The bike was known for its "hyper acceleration".

A two-seater version, the F4 RR 312 1+1 was also available.

F4 1078 RR 312 Edizione Finale
In 2010 the F4 1078 RR 312 Edizione Finale was released as the final model of the original F4 series. The model featured a custom quilted leather saddle and a special identification plaque. Only 30 units were made, all of which were sold in Japan.

Second generation

F4

In 2010, the new F4 was introduced. The engine, whilst retaining the bore and stroke and 16 radial valve layout of the previous engines, was extensively redesigned. Changes include a new crankshaft, lighter conrods, shorter inlet tracts, titanium inlet valves, twin injectors, oil pump, deeper sump, cooling system and generator. The new unit produces  at 12,900 rpm.

A new frame was used that was lighter but more rigid than previous models. The swing arm pivot mas been relocated to allow a longer swinging arm without increasing the wheelbase. 50 mm Upside down Marzocchi forks are fitted to the front and a fully adjustable Sachs shock absorber is fitted to the rear. Ride height is adjustable. Twin 320 mm disc brakes are fitted on the front with radial Brembo 4-pot calipers, and a 210mm rear disc with Nissin 4-pot caliper on the rear.

The bike was available in pastel red/metallic silver, gloss black/matt black or titanium grey/admiral grey and was 10 kg lighter and 40 mm narrower than its predecessors.

In 2013, the F4 received a 195 bhp version of the short-stroke "Corsacorta" engine that had previously been used on the F4 R and F4 RR models.

F4 Frecce Tricolori
The F4 Frecce Tricolori was a limited-edition motorcycle released in late 2010 to commemorate the 50th anniversary of the Frecce Tricolori, the aerobatic demonstration team of the Italian Aeronautica Militare. 11 machines were produced, reflecting the 11 aircraft of the display team. The machines featured titanium and carbon fibre parts, and were finished in the blue/white/red Tricolori livery of the display aircraft.

Each machine carries a silver plate with the number and designation of the aircraft it was associated with. The machines were delivered at a dedicated event day at the Rivolto Air Force Base, home of the Frecce Tricolori.

F4 RR

The F4 RR, also known as the F4 RR Corsacorta (short stroke) was first introduced in 2011. Bore was increased from 76 to 79 mm and stroke reduced from 55 to 50.9 mm. Virtually every component in the engine was new, including: primary drive; cylinder head; larger titanium valves; lightweight forged pistons in "aerospace RR alloy" and two fuel injectors per cylinder. The "TSS" variable length intake ducts system was used. A close-ratio gearbox was fitted.

The frame had an adjustable steering head and an adjustable swinging arm pivot. Front forks were 43 mm, titanium nitride coated Öhlins NIX upside-down units. At the rear was an Öhlins Racing TTX 36 rear shock, with multiple adjustments, including ride height. Lightweight forged aluminium wheels and Brembo racing brakes were fitted.

The model was available in pastel red/white or matt pearl white finish.

F4 R
In 2012, MV introduced a more affordable version of the F4 RR, the F4 R. The "R" was introduced at a cost of €18,500, €4,100 less than the F4 RR.

A variant of the  "Corsacorta" short-stroke engine was used, which gave  at 13,500 rpm. Frame was from the F4 as were the 50 mm Marzocchi forks, rear Sach shock absorber, Brembo front brakes and cast wheels.

The machine was available in a red/grey or white/medium grey finish.

F4 RC

The limited edition F4 RC (Reparto Corse) was introduced in 2015 and manufactured to Superbike World Championship specifications. An updated version of the short-stroke "Corsacorta" engine was fitted. Output was increased to 205 bhp at 13,450 rpm with the road exhaust, and 212 bhp with the supplied race kit which includes a SC-Project titanium single exit exhaust and matching ECU.

Much use was made of magnesium, titanium and carbon fibre to reduce the weight 7 kg compared to the F4 RR. The race kit reduced weight by a further 6 kg. Ohlins suspension and Brembo bakes were fitted, both the same as fitted to the RR model.

The livery was the same red, white and green as used by Leon Camier in the Superbike Championship. Production was limited to 250 machines.

Following the termination of the partnership between MV Agusta and Mercedes-AMG in 2016, the machine was relaunched in 2017 without the AMG graphics in the livery. A further change to the livery in 2018 to reflect the colours used in WSBK that season.

F4 LH44
In 2017, the limited edition F4 LH44 was announced. Based on the F4 RC, the machine features a livery designed by F1 world champion Lewis Hamilton, in conjunction with the CRC (Castiglioni Research Center). The machine is finished in red and black with a white frame. Suspension, Öhlins USD NIX 30 TiN-coated forks and TTX 36 rear shock, has been anodised in black by special arrangement with Öhlins. Special edition Pirelli DIABLO Supercorsa SP tyres are fitted which feature red sidewalls and the LH44 logo. Production is limited to 44 machines, 44 being Hamilton's race number in F1.

F4 Claudio 
The F4 Claudio, named after Claudio Castiglioni, was released in November 2018 at EICMA. It is a limited edition model based on the F4 RC and marks the last update that will be given to the F4 series due to the Euro4 emissions laws. It shares many of the features seen on the MV Agusta model that competes in the World Superbike Championship. The engine has titanium connecting rods, the crankshaft has been specifically designed and balanced, and the combustion chamber is fitted with radially-set valves.

The F4 Claudio uses dual exit titanium SC-Project racing exhaust system with a dedicated control unit. There is a wide range of electronics with four maps on offer, which can be selected instantaneously via the racing push-buttons. The braking system includes Brembo Stylema 4-piston Monobloc radial calipers with dual  front disc brakes, and Öhlins shock absorbers.

Carbon fiber has been used extensively to keep the bike's weight low, including a full carbon fiber fairing and lightweight carbon wheels. The bolts and screws are made from titanium, with CNC-machined aluminium alloys used extensively on functional components such as the triple clamp, height-adjustable footpegs, brake and clutch levers, and brake fluid reservoir plugs and filler cap. The F4 Claudio is limited to 100 bikes, with the price starting from $83,000.

Comparison of F4 models

Racing

Giovanni Castiglioni, chairman and President of MV Agusta, signed an agreement with Alexander Yakhnich, Chairman of Yakhnich Motorsport, to establish the new MV Agusta Reparto Corse for the 2014 season. The team was operated by Yakhnich Motorsport and competed in the World Supersport, using the MV Agusta F3, and World Superbike Championships, using the F4 In June 2014 Castiglioni and Yakhnich signed an agreement that stipulated MV Agusta would take over all operations concerning the racing team.

For the 2014 WSBK Season, Claudio Corti rode for the team and finished 17th in the championship. Leon Camier substituted for Corti at Laguna Seca and a privately entered F4 ridden by Nicolas Salchaud competed at Magny-Cours.

In 2015, 2016 and 2017, Leon Camier was the rider for the team, finishing 13th, 8th and 8th in the Championship in these years.

MV Agusta Reparto Corse partnered with Team Vamag in late 2017 in preparation for the 2018 Supersport World Championship. The team was known as MV Agusta Reparto Corse by Vamag that season. Jordi Torres was the team's rider except for the last two races, where Maximilian Scheib rode. Torres finished 13th in the championship.

References

External links 
 1&id=1899 MV Agusta Reviews Road tests of the MV Agusta F4 models
 MV Agusta Motorcycles official site

 

 

F4 series
Sport bikes
Motorcycles introduced in 1999
Motorcycles designed by Massimo Tamburini